John Michael Gibbon (born 27 January 1942) is an English television producer and director.

He directed and produced the BBC televised soap opera, EastEnders. He began directing the programme in 1985 and began producing the programme in 1988. He became the show's new producer following the departure of the show's creator and series producer Julia Smith. Due to personal conflict with the series' head, Peter Cregeen, he was replaced by Michael Ferguson. It was reported that Gibbon controversially called for the killing of at least ten long-running characters in a bid to boost ratings. According to the writer David Yallop, acting ability was a key factor in deciding which members of the cast to kill off. Cast lists were marked with black asterisks, signifying a death for their character. One of the written plots saw characters die in an IRA bombing. However, the plots never came to fruition, as Gibbon was demoted and then resigned from the serial.

He is also the deviser and adaptor, with David Yallop, of Herbert Jenkins's Bindle book series.

Gibbon married Moya McCarthy in July 1976 and they have a daughter, Sophie.

Filmography
New Scotland Yard (1972) - director
Helen: A Woman of Today (1973) - director
Thick as Thieves (1974) - director
Within These Walls (1974) - director
Intimate Strangers (1974) - director
Emmerdale Farm -director
The Brack Report (1982) - director
Airline - director
Fair City (1988) - director
EastEnders (1988–89) - producer
City of the Rich - executive producer
 The Log of the Ark - producer
Remains To Be Seen
The League Against Christmas

References

External links

1942 births
Living people
English television directors
English television producers
People from Gerrards Cross